Chaetoscutula is a fungal genus in the class Dothideomycetes. The relationship of this taxon to other taxa within the class is unknown (incertae sedis). A monotypic genus, it contains the single species Chaetoscutula juniperi. The genus was circumscribed by Emil Müller in 1959.

See also
List of Dothideomycetes genera incertae sedis

References

Dothideomycetes enigmatic taxa
Monotypic Dothideomycetes genera